Larry Robert Seiple (born February 14, 1945) is a former American football player and coach.  He played professionally as a punter for the Miami Dolphins of the American Football League (AFL) from 1967 through 1969, and the NFL's Dolphins from 1970 through 1977.

Early life and education
Seiple was born in Allentown, Pennsylvania, where he played football for William Allen High School. 

He played collegiate football at the University of Kentucky. At Kentucky, Seiple played wide receiver and running back, while also handling punts, kickoffs, and kickoff returns. He was a second-team All-Southeastern Conference selection in his junior season, averaging 4.3 yards per carry while also scoring 9 touchdowns and gaining 1,081 yards of offense.  n three seasons, Seiple gained 2,137 yards from scrimmage and scored 18 touchdowns, while setting school records for average yards per catch, both in a season (23.5 in 1965) and in a career (19.8).  He had four receptions of at least 70 yards, and once converted a 4th and 41 with a 70 yard touchdown on a fake punt.

Football career

National Football League
Seiple entered the 1967 NFL Draft and was selected by the Miami Dolphins in Round 7 with the 163rd overall selection. Unlike most punters, Seiple also caught and carried the ball on occasion for the Dolphins. His most prolific year was 1969 when he netted 577 yards and scored five touchdowns, leading the Dolphins in both categories that year. Seiple was often able to rush for yards instead of punting. That type of risk paid dividends for the Dolphins in a 1972 playoff game against the Pittsburgh Steelers in which he ran for a 37-yard gain, keeping a drive alive. Miami would go on to win that game and the Super Bowl that year, completing a  perfect season of 17–0, the only perfect season by an NFL team in the league's history.

Coaching career
Seiple was the offensive coordinator at Florida Atlantic University, where the head coach was another former University of Kentucky player, Howard Schnellenberger. Seiple coached with the Dolphins as assistant coach for quarterbacks from 1998 to 1999, and for wide receivers from 1988 to 1997, the Tampa Bay Buccaneers as assistant coach for wide receivers from  1985 to 1986, and the Detroit Lions from 1980 to 1984.

On June 20, 2014 it was announced that Seiple would be inducted into the Kentucky Pro Football Hall of Fame.

References

External links

1945 births
Living people
American Football League players
American football punters
Detroit Lions coaches
Florida Atlantic Owls football coaches
Kentucky Wildcats football players
Miami Dolphins coaches
Miami Dolphins players
Players of American football from Pennsylvania
Sportspeople from Allentown, Pennsylvania
Tampa Bay Buccaneers coaches
William Allen High School alumni